John Christopher Stevens (April 18, 1960 – September 11, 2012) was an American career diplomat and lawyer who served as the U.S. Ambassador to Libya from May 22, 2012, to September 11, 2012. Stevens was killed when the U.S. Special Mission in Benghazi, Libya, was attacked by members of Ansar al-Sharia on September 11–12, 2012.

Stevens was the eighth U.S. Ambassador to be killed while in office.

Early life and education
Stevens was born on April 18, 1960, in Grass Valley, California, the eldest of three siblings born to Jan S. Stevens, a California Assistant Attorney General, and his wife Mary J. Stevens (née Floris; born 1937), from a West Coast family of French, Swedish and Chinook ancestry. Stevens was raised in Northern California and had two younger siblings, Anne (b. 1962) and Thomas (b. 1965).

Stevens' parents divorced in 1975, and both remarried. Stevens, himself, never married. His mother, a cellist, joined the Marin Symphony Orchestra (1969—2004), and in 1976 married Robert Commanday, a music critic with the San Francisco Chronicle.

Stevens was an AFS Intercultural Programs exchange student in Spain during summer of 1977, and graduated from Piedmont High School in 1978. He earned BA degree in history in 1982 at the University of California, Berkeley, where he was a member of Alpha Tau Omega fraternity. From 1983 to 1985, he taught English as a Peace Corps volunteer in Morocco. He graduated with JD degree from University of California, Hastings College of Law in 1989, and received MS degree from the National War College of National Defense University in 2010.

Career

Lawyer
Prior to joining the United States Foreign Service, Stevens was an international trade attorney based in Washington, D.C. He was admitted as an active member of the State Bar of California on January 26, 1990; he went on an inactive status on August 1, 1991, and remained an inactive member for the remainder of his career.

U.S. Foreign Service
Stevens joined the United States Foreign Service in 1991. His early overseas assignments included: deputy principal officer and political section chief in Jerusalem, political officer in Damascus, consular/political officer in Cairo, and consular/economic officer in Riyadh. In Washington, Stevens served as director of the Office of Multilateral Nuclear and Security Affairs, Pearson Fellow with the Senate Foreign Relations Committee and Senator Richard Lugar, special assistant to Undersecretary for Political Affairs, Iran desk officer, and staff assistant in the Bureau of Near Eastern Affairs.

He had served in Libya twice previously: as Deputy Chief of Mission, 2007 to 2009, and as Special Representative to the National Transitional Council, March 2011 to November 2011, during Libyan revolution. He arrived in Tripoli in May 2012 as U.S. Ambassador to Libya.

Stevens spoke English, French, and some Arabic.

Death
  
During the 2012 Benghazi attack, a fire was set against the wall of the main consulate building while three Americans were inside—Stevens, Sean Smith, and a security officer. According to U.S. officials, the security officer escaped; the staff found Smith dead. They were unable to locate Stevens before being driven from the building under large arms fire.  Local civilians found Stevens and brought him to the Benghazi Medical Centre in a state of cardiac arrest. Medical personnel tried to resuscitate him, but he was pronounced dead at about 2 a.m. local time on September 12, 2012. Later reports suggested that the attack was coordinated and planned, with any protests either coincidental or possibly diversionary.  Libyan president Muhammad Magariaf blamed elements of Ansar al-Sharia for the killing, linking them to Al-Qaeda in the Islamic Maghreb. Libyan officials suggested that it might have been a revenge attack mounted by loyalists (of deceased Libyan leader Muammar Gaddafi) who were defeated in the Libyan Civil War the previous year.
The doctors who tended to Stevens said that no visible physical wounds were found on his body and that he died from smoke inhalation, making hypoxia the cause of his death.

The surviving Americans were taken to a safe house. A rescue squad consisting of eight former U.S. military was sent from Tripoli, the capital. They were ambushed and the safe house came under attack. Two more Americans died, including one sent from Tripoli; several were wounded. Later reports identified the victims as Tyrone S. Woods and Glen A. Doherty, both former Navy SEALs working as security and intelligence contractors.

Stevens is buried in New Elm Ridge Cemetery (formerly known as Forester's Cemetery) in Grass Valley, California.

See also
 Arnold Lewis Raphel, the previous U.S. ambassador to die in the line of duty
 Ambassadors of the United States killed in the line of duty
 List of assassinated American politicians

References

External links
  – U.S. Embassy Tripoli video
 Memorial site
 Ambassador Christopher Stevens FB Memorial Page
 

1960 births
2012 murders in Libya
2012 deaths
20th-century American lawyers
21st-century American diplomats
Ambassadors of the United States to Libya
American people murdered abroad
American people of French descent
American people of Swedish descent
American people who self-identify as being of Native American descent
American terrorism victims
Assassinated American diplomats
Burials in California
California lawyers
Deaths by smoke inhalation
Murdered Native American people
National War College alumni
Peace Corps volunteers
People from Davis, California
People from Grass Valley, California
People from Piedmont, California
People murdered in Libya
United States Foreign Service personnel
University of California, Berkeley alumni
University of California, Hastings College of the Law alumni
Deaths from hypoxia